Jorge Roche (born 19 November 1957) is a Cuban gymnast. He competed in eight events at the 1980 Summer Olympics.

References

1957 births
Living people
Cuban male artistic gymnasts
Olympic gymnasts of Cuba
Gymnasts at the 1980 Summer Olympics
Place of birth missing (living people)
Pan American Games medalists in gymnastics
Pan American Games gold medalists for Cuba
Pan American Games silver medalists for Cuba
Pan American Games bronze medalists for Cuba
Gymnasts at the 1979 Pan American Games
Medalists at the 1979 Pan American Games
Originators of elements in artistic gymnastics
20th-century Cuban people
21st-century Cuban people